Lee Roberson Chatfield (born May 25, 1988) is an American politician and a Republican former member of the Michigan House of Representatives. He was first elected from the 107th House district in 2015. He was speaker pro tempore from 2017 to 2019, and speaker of the Michigan House of Representatives from 2019 to 2021.

Education and career before politics
Chatfield received a bachelor's degree from Northland International University, a Baptist college in Wisconsin, and a master's degree from Liberty University in Virginia. Before his election to the state House in 2014, he worked at a Christian school in northern Michigan operated by his father, a minister. Chatfield was a teacher, coach and athletic director at the school.

Michigan House of Representatives 

Chatfield was first elected to the Michigan House of Representatives in 2014, after defeating a Republican incumbent, Frank Foster, in the primary election. Chatfield criticized Foster for supporting Medicaid expansion and for supporting an extension of Michigan's Elliott-Larsen Civil Rights Act to prohibit discrimination on the basis of sexual orientation in housing and employment.

Chatfield took office in 2015. He was re-elected to the state Legislature in 2016 with 67 percent of the vote, and in 2018, with over 58 percent of the vote.

Speakership
Chatfield was speaker of the state House from 2019 to 2020. Elected at age 30; he was believed to be the youngest House speaker in recent memory. Legislators assuming the role of House Speaker in Michigan at age 30 or younger are as follows: Kinsley Bingham at age 29 in 1838, Alfred Hanscom at age 26 in 1845, Byron Stout at age 27 in 1857, Sullivan Cutcheon at age 29 in 1863, Daniel Markey at age 29 in 1887, William Tateum at age 30 in 1889, and Gilbert Currie at age 30 in 1913.

During Chatfield's tenure as speaker of the House, Michigan had divided government, with both chambers of the legislature controlled by Republicans, but with a Democratic governor (Gretchen Whitmer). Chatfield and the Senate Majority Leader Mike Shirkey both repeatedly clashed with Whitmer over issues such as the state budget, road funding, auto insurance legislation, and criminal justice legislation.

As speaker, Chatfield presided over the passage of a bipartisan auto insurance bill that allowed motorists to choose their level of personal injury protection coverage. However, proposed road infrastructure improvements became mired in deadlock, with Chatfield rejecting a proposal by Whitmer to fund road repairs by raising the gas tax by 45 cents. Negotiations for long-term road funding broke down, and Legislature passed a bill without support from Whitmer's administration. Whitmer signed the bill, but with 147 line-item vetoes plus several administrative transfers.

Chatfield and Shirkey both opposed Whitmer's actions to use a government shutdown on business during COVID.

Controversies

Firearms security violation 
In 2018, Chatfield attempted to bring a loaded, unregistered handgun onto a commercial flight at Pellston Regional Airport. He was fined $250 for failure to register his handgun, which he had purchased in December 2015. He also paid a $1,960 fine from the Transportation Security Administration. Chatfield had previously introduced a bill in the Michigan House of Representatives to make handgun registration voluntary.

Role in 2020 presidential election 
Chatfield was a strong supporter of President Donald Trump. Chatfield, along with Michigan Senate Majority Leader Mike Shirkey, met with Trump on November 20, 2020, as Trump and his campaign attempted to overturn the results of the presidential election, in which Trump was defeated by Joe Biden (both nationally and in Michigan). Paul Mitchell, the U.S. representative for Michigan's 10th congressional district, said that the purpose of the meeting may have been to discuss the appointment of pro-Trump electors to the U.S. Electoral College. Despite pressure from Trump, Chatfield ultimately declined to support passage of a Michigan Legislation to pass a resolution purporting to retroactively change Michigan's slate of electors for Trump, saying that such a move "would bring mutually assured destruction for every future election in regards to the Electoral College" and "we would lose our country forever."

Allegations of sexual assault and financial impropriety 
On January 6, 2022, The Detroit News reported Michigan State Police were investigating Chatfield over allegations that he sexually abused a girl for 12 years, beginning in 2009 when she was between 14 and 15 years old and continuing until 2021. When she was 18 she married Aaron Chatfield, Lee's brother. Lee Chatfield has admitted having an affair with his sister-in-law and with other women, but said that these affairs were between consenting adults.

The sexual abuse is alleged to have begun when the girl was attending Chatfield's church, Northern Michigan Baptist Bible Church, and continued while she was a student at the school associated with the church, where Chatfield taught physical education.

In February 2022, state police searched the home of Chatfield's former top staff members, Rob and Anne Minard. Anne Minard was the treasurer for four of Chatfield's political action committees. The Peninsula Fund, a non-profit run by Chatfield, is also registered at address of the Minards' consulting firm. Chatfield's lawyer claimed that the search was an attempt to falsely connect Chatfield to financial improprieties.

Chatfield's successor, House Speaker Jason Wentworth, has ordered all members to preserve records dealing with the conduct of Chatfield.

Post legislative career 
Due to term limits, Chatfield was ineligible to run for another term in the Michigan House of Representatives. In mid-February 2021, after leaving office, Chatfield was appointed as the new CEO of Southwest Michigan First, a privately funded economic development organization covering the seven counties of southwest Michigan (Berrien, Branch, Calhoun, Cass, Kalamazoo, St. Joseph and Van Buren).

Chatfield's hiring caused a backlash due to Chatfield's past stances in opposition to LGBTQ rights. Various groups including the City of Kalamazoo and the Kalamazoo Promise, pulled support from Southwest Michigan First.

Following the backlash from his hiring, Southwest Michigan First and Chatfield stated that they would support expanding the state's civil rights act (the Elliott-Larsen Civil Rights Act) to prohibit discrimination based on sexual orientation and gender identity, a stance that the Southwest Michigan First board had voted in 2017 to support. During his tenure in the Michigan House, Chatfield had opposed such an expansion, which he viewed as an infringement on religious freedom. A few days after beginning his new job, Chatfield resigned, citing the controversy.

Personal life 
Lee married his high school sweetheart, Stephanie (Zondervan), and they have four sons and one daughter.

References

External links 
  (Michigan House Republicans)

|-

1988 births
21st-century American politicians
Liberty University alumni
Living people
People from Emmet County, Michigan
Speakers of the Michigan House of Representatives
Republican Party members of the Michigan House of Representatives